Zenodo is a general-purpose open repository developed under the European OpenAIRE program and operated by CERN.
It allows researchers to deposit research papers, data sets, research software, reports, and any other research related digital artefacts. For each submission, a persistent digital object identifier (DOI) is minted, which makes the stored items easily citeable.

Characteristics 

Zenodo was launched on May 8th 2013 as the successor of the OpenAIRE Orphan Records Repository to let researchers in any subject area comply with any open science deposit requirement absent an institutional repository.
It was relaunched as Zenodo in 2015 to provide a place for researchers to deposit datasets; it allows the uploading of files up to 50 GB.

It provides a DOI to datasets and other submitted data that lacks one to make the work easier to cite and supports various data and license types. One supported source is GitHub repositories.

Zenodo is supported by CERN "as a marginal activity" and hosted on the high-performance computing infrastructure that is primarily operated for the needs of high-energy physics.

Zenodo is run with Invenio (a free software framework for large-scale digital repositories), wrapped by a small extra layer of code that is also called Zenodo.

History 

In 2019, Zenodo announced a partnership with the fellow data repository Dryad to co-develop new solutions focused on supporting researcher and publisher workflows as well as best practices in software and data curation.

As of 2021, Zenodo's publicly available statistics for open items reported a total of over 45 million "unique views" and over 55 million "unique downloads".
Also in 2021, Zenodo reported it had crossed 1 Petabyte in hosted data and 15 million yearly visits.

References

External links 
 Zenodo home page

Information technology organizations based in Europe
Open-access archives
Open data

CERN
Bibliographic databases and indexes